"When I'm Dead and Gone" is a song written by Benny Gallagher and Graham Lyle.

Background
"When I'm Dead and Gone" was one of the first hit singles to feature prominent use of mandolin, played by Lyle, who also took lead vocal.  Gallagher played bass guitar and sang tenor harmony, while both he and Lyle also played kazoos and guitarist Tom McGuinness played the dobro solo.

According to McGuinness, "You can get to number one in England and sell 200,000 total. But [the single's release] was over Christmas and it sold 400,000 ... it sold a couple of hundred thousand in America, 100,000 in Germany, 50,000 in Japan."

After Gallagher and Lyle left the group and enjoyed a successful career as a duo, they featured the song regularly on stage - though usually in the lower key of C, rather than the original key of D, and eschewing kazoos in favour of a harmonica, which Gallagher used on a harness.  This treatment of the song can be heard on the duo's 1999 album Live In Concert.

Chart performance
It was recorded and released in November 1970 as the debut single by McGuinness Flint, peaked at No. 2 in the UK charts the following month, and reached No. 47 in the US charts in February 1971. The song also peaked at No.5 in Ireland, No. 6 in West Germany, No. 39 in Australia, No.34 in Canada, and No. 4 in Singapore.

Cover versions 

 Bob Summers recored a cover which reached number 18 on the Bubbling Under Hot 100 (number 118 on the Hot 100) in 1971.

References

1970 singles
Songs written by Benny Gallagher
Songs written by Graham Lyle
Gallagher and Lyle songs
1970 songs
Capitol Records singles
Song recordings produced by Glyn Johns